Roger Najar Kokally (born 26 September 1956) is a Peruvian politician and a former Congressman representing Ucayali in the 2006–2011 term.

Biography

Early life, education and career 
He was born in Pucallpa, Ucayali on September 26, 1956. He studied primary and secondary school in his hometown. He is a small businessman. He founded the NGO “Amazonía Siempre verde”, he is also co-founder of CGTP Ucayali.

In 1975 he began economics studies at the Inca Garcilaso de la Vega University, a career that he put aside in 1978.

Political career 
In the regional elections of 2002 he ran as a candidate for regional councilor for We Are Peru without winning the election.

He was elected congressman for Ucayali in 2006 as a member of the Union for Peru during the second government of Alan García Pérez. He ran for reelection as a congressman in the 2016 elections without obtaining success.

In the regional elections of 2018, Najar ran as a candidate of Peru Libertario for regional governor of Ucayali, winning ninth place.

He was coordinator of the "Bicentennial Plan" of the Free Peru party during the 2021 general elections.

References

External links
Official Congressional Site

Living people
Union for Peru politicians
Members of the Congress of the Republic of Peru
Place of birth missing (living people)
1956 births
People from Pucallpa
21st-century Peruvian politicians